Time travel is a common plot element in fiction. Works where it plays a prominent role are listed below. For stories of time travel in antiquity, see the history of the time travel concept. For video games and interactive media featuring time travel, see list of games containing time travel.

Time travel in novels, short stories and on the stage

This list describes novels and short stories in which time travel is central to the plot or the premise of the work. Works created prior to the 18th century are listed in Time travel § History of the time travel concept.

Time travel in films

Time travel is a common theme and plot device in science fiction films. The list below covers films for which time travel is central to the plot or premise of the work.

Time travel in television series

Time travel is a recurrent theme in science fiction television programs. The list below covers television series for which time travel is central to the premise and direction of the plot and setting.

See also
 List of films featuring time loops

References

External links

 
Lists of films by topic
Science fiction bibliographies
Time travel
History of fiction